Torazu is one of six parishes (administrative divisions)  in Cabranes, a municipality within the province and autonomous community of Asturias, in northern Spain. 

Villages
 Castiellu
 Cervera
 La Cotariella
 Miangues
 La Parte
 Peñella
 La Rebollada
 Torazu

References

Parishes in Cabranes